Luke Kipkosgei (born 27 November 1975 in Iten) is a Kenyan long-distance runner who is most known for his track running over 3000 metres and 5000 metres.

His first major medals came in 1998: he took the 5000 metres gold medal at the 1998 Goodwill Games and then a silver medal behind Haile Gebrselassie over 3000 m at the 1998 IAAF Grand Prix Final. Two years later at the 2000 IAAF Grand Prix Final, he won the gold in the event. A silver medal over 5000 m at the 2001 Goodwill Games was followed by a bronze at the 2001 IAAF Grand Prix Final. He is a four-time winner of the Zatopek 10,000 metres race in Australia and holds the current race record of 27:22.54, set in 1998.

He has also competed in cross country running and won the Cross Internacional Valle de Llodio in 1998 and the Cross de l'Acier in 2000. He was the silver medallist in the short race at the 2002 IAAF World Cross Country Championships, finishing behind Kenenisa Bekele but helping Kenya to the team gold. He won his first global track medal at the 2003 IAAF World Indoor Championships, taking the bronze medal over 3000 m.

He later switched to road running and took 10K wins at the Cooper River Bridge Run in 2004 and the Azalea Trail Run in 2005. He made his debut over the marathon distance at the 2010 Antwerp Marathon and recorded a time of 2:14:37 for second place.

In December 2010 Luke was invited back to Melbourne as part of the 50th Anniversary celebrations of the Zatopek:10.  Luke decided to also race the 10000m track event, placing 5th behind Josphat Menjo in 28:47.  Despite being the fastest 10000m runner of 2010, Menjo was unable to break Luke's race record, winning in a time of 27:39.80.

He trains with Kimbia Athletics and is coached by Dieter Hogen.

Achievements

Personal bests
1500 metres - 3:35.48 min (1998)
3000 metres - 7:27.59 min (1998)
5000 metres - 12:56.50 min (2000)
10,000 metres - 27:12.37 min (2001)
Half marathon - 1:01:18 (2007)
Marathon - 2:14:37 (2010)

References

External links

Kimbia Athletics

1975 births
Living people
People from Elgeyo-Marakwet County
Kenyan male long-distance runners
Kenyan male marathon runners
Kenyan male cross country runners
Goodwill Games medalists in athletics
Competitors at the 1998 Goodwill Games
Competitors at the 2001 Goodwill Games